Denis Nikolayevich Shcherbitsky (born 14 April 1996) is a Belarusian professional footballer who plays for BATE Borisov.

Honours
BATE Borisov
Belarusian Premier League champion: 2016, 2017, 2018
Belarusian Cup winner: 2019–20, 2020–21
Belarusian Super Cup winner: 2017

References

External links
 
 
 Profile at BATE website

1996 births
Living people
Footballers from Minsk
Belarusian footballers
Association football goalkeepers
Belarus international footballers
FC BATE Borisov players